The ninth season of the American crime thriller television series The Blacklist premiered on October 21, 2021, on NBC, and ended on May 27, 2022. The season consisted of 22 episodes. This is the first season without Jon Bokenkamp as showrunner and Megan Boone as Elizabeth Keen. It is also the last season to star Amir Arison as Aram Mojtabai and Laura Sohn as Alina Park. The season is produced by Davis Entertainment, Universal Television and Sony Pictures Television. All executive producers (except Bokenkamp) remain the same: John Eisendrath, John Davis, Joe Carnahan and John Fox.

Overview
The ninth season explores the reunion of Raymond Reddington (James Spader) and the members of his disbanded Task Force two years after Reddington's failed attempt to hand his empire over to Elizabeth Keen (Megan Boone) and the murder of the latter. During that time, many changes related to Reddington's Task Force and his criminal empire have happened; Donald Ressler (Diego Klattenhoff) retired from FBI and got addicted to oxycodone while resided in New York suburb, Aram Mojtabai (Amir Arison) developed his security software and ran his own business, Dembe Zuma (Hisham Tawfiq) was assigned as an FBI agent while Marvin Gerard (Fisher Stevens) became the factual leader of Red's collapsing empire. After Dembe's injury in service, Reddington agreed to resume his deal with Harold Cooper (Harry Lennix) and restore his Blacklist of criminals for his immunity. The first part of the season is primarily focused on capturing various new criminals by Task Force and explaining how Elizabeth's death had affected the Task Force and relationships between Red and Dembe. Starting with episode 15, the focus of the series switches to further investigations of Liz's murder as some new details and inconsistencies about it emerge. Another main plot is the murder of Cooper's neighbour, for which he is framed by the detectives and blackmailed by the actual killer. Feared for his foster daughter Agnes, he starts his own investigation to find the blackmailer, which he keeps in secret from everyone, including Reddington Soon, both investigations intertwine in search of the same mysterious common enemy, who in the season finale is disclosed to be Marvin, trying to avoid letting Elizabeth control the empire due to her inexperience and inability to management. While Marvin is incarcarated and behind bars, he helps former blacklister Wujing (Chin Han) escape and passes him The Blacklist, setting the scene for future seasons. After Reddington finds out about the unfaithfulness of the Task Force, he leaves it once again. Aram also takes a break from his police duty in the end of the season, marking the end of Arison serving the main role in the series.

Cast

Main cast
 James Spader as Raymond "Red" Reddington
 Diego Klattenhoff as Donald Ressler 
 Amir Arison as Aram Mojtabai
 Laura Sohn as Alina Park
 Hisham Tawfiq as Dembe Zuma
 Harry Lennix as Harold Cooper

Recurring
 Sami Bray as Agnes Keen
 Hazel Mason as younger Agnes Keen
 Diany Rodriguez as Weecha Xiu
 Karina Arroyave as Mierce Xiu
 Fisher Stevens as Marvin Gerard
 Valarie Pettiford as Charlene Cooper
 Colby Lewis as Peter Simpson
 Danny Mastrogiorgio as Lew Sloan
 Mike Houston as Detective Heber
 Deirdre Lovejoy as Cynthia Panabaker
 Teddy Coluca as Teddy Brimley
 Jonathan Holtzman as Chuck
 Mario Peguero as Santiago

Guest starring
 Genson Blimline as Morgan
 Stacy Keach as Robert Vesco
 Aida Turturro as Heddie Hawkins
 Joely Richardson as Cassandra Bianchi
 Patricia Richardson as Matilda David
 Ross Partridge as Reggie Cole
 Teagle F. Bougere as Tyson Lacroix
 Gregory Korostishevsky as Vladmir Cvetko
 Mozhan Marnò as Samar Navabi
 Lukas Hassel as Elias Vandyke
 Chin Han as Wujing

Episodes

Production

Development
Series creator Jon Bokenkamp did not return as a showrunner for this season. Executive producer John Eisendrath took his place as a showrunner.

Casting
 Megan Boone departed the series prior the start of filming the season. However, the character she portrayed, Elizabeth Keen, made brief appearances throughout the season.

 Sami Bray joined the series in a recurring role as Agnes Keen.

 Diany Rodriguez joined the series in a recurring role as Weecha Xiu.

 Karina Arroyave took the recurring role as Mierce Xiu.

 Colby Lewis was promoted to season recurring role as Peter Simpson after his guest appearance in the first episode of the season.

 Mozhan Marnò returned to the series for the first time after her departure in season 6 as Samar Navabi.

 Genson Blimline, who had been portraying Morgan, departed near the end of the season after his character died offscreen.

 Shortly after the season finale, both Arison and Sohn left the series after nine and two series, respectively. Arison later starred in The Kite Runner on Broadway, while Sohn moved to other projects. Meanwhile, Fisher Stevens, who also departed following the episode, got nominated for 47th Saturn Awards for best guest starring role.

Filming
Filming for the season began in September 2021 with fully safety protocols amid the COVID-19 pandemic. In February 2022, it was mentioned that 22 episodes were to be filmed for the season. Filming officially wrapped in May 2022.

Ratings

References

External links
 
 

2021 American television seasons
2022 American television seasons
9